"Savin' Me" is a song written and performed by Canadian band Nickelback. It was released as the third major single from their fifth studio album, All the Right Reasons (2005). The song reached number two on the Canadian Singles Chart, became another top-10 hit for the band in New Zealand, peaking at number nine, and peaked at number 19 on the U.S. Billboard Hot 100 chart. The music video was very well received and it is among their most well known videos. When the song returned to the band's live setlist during their Feed the Machine Tour; an edited version of the video, without the parts showing the band, was played on the big screen during the performance, being the only song with a music video during their live performances.

The verse "I'm on the ledge of the eighteenth story" is a reference to the eighteenth chapter of Dante Alighieri's poem Inferno, the first part of the Divine Comedy. The song was featured in the closing credits to the film The Condemned as well as in the commercials for the third season of Battlestar Galactica and the second season of Prison Break.  It was also the title theme for the TV series Surgery Saved My Life.

Music video
The music video opens with a man in a trenchcoat wandering near a street corner with a confused look on his face. He then sees another man talking on a cell phone about to get hit by a New Jersey Transit bus, and pulls him back just in the nick of time, and then walks away. The second man starts staring at other people as the song begins.
 
 
Eventually, the viewer sees that the second man sees timers (counting in seconds) with glowing numbers counting down above the heads of everyone around him. To everyone else, he appears to be crazy. He is baffled by the meaning of the timers until he sees an elderly woman being brought out on a stretcher to a waiting ambulance: when the timer above her head reaches zero, she dies. Shortly afterwards, he sees a young woman sitting down and peeling an orange. She has numbers above her head and in front of her pregnant stomach. He also sees that he cannot see the timer above his own head. He soon spots a business woman about to enter her car, and sees her timer rapidly dwindles much faster than it should, dropping from the millions to the single digits in a matter of seconds. Realizing what's about to happen, he pulls her out of the way in nick of time, just like the first man in the beginning did to him, before her car is crushed by a falling statue in a crate (which, in an example of foreshadowing, can be seen in midair about halfway through the video (timestamp 2:00 as well as the lyrics just afterwards: "I'm callin'"). The second man, talking on a cell phone, then walks away with his own reappearing glowing numbers overhead, just as the man who had saved him did, leaving the businesswoman astonished as she now sees the timers over everyone else's heads.

The band is in an apartment; Chad Kroeger and Ryan Peake are singing on camera, but no instruments are played; the other band members are seen simply staring at the camera, or into space. It was filmed over 2 days, in Vancouver on West Hastings and Burrard Street and directed by Nigel Dick.

Charts

Weekly charts

Year-end charts

Certifications

Release history

References

Nickelback songs
2006 singles
Music videos directed by Nigel Dick
Roadrunner Records singles
Rock ballads
Songs about suicide
Songs written by Chad Kroeger
Songs written by Daniel Adair
Songs written by Mike Kroeger